Aaronovich, Aaronovitch or Aharonovich is a Jewish surname. Notable people with the surname include:
Igor Aharonovich (born 1982), Australian physicist 
Yitzhak Aharonovich (born 1950), Israeli politician
Sam Aaronovitch (1919–1998), economist and British communist activist and his sons:
David Aaronovitch (born 1954), English journalist, broadcaster, and author
Owen Aaronovitch (born 1956), English actor
Ben Aaronovitch (born 1964), English writer

See also
Aronowicz
Aronov
Aronin

Jewish surnames
Slavic-language surnames